Friends of the Earth International (FoEI) is an international network of environmental organizations in 73 countries. The organization was founded in 1969 in San Francisco by David Brower, Donald Aitken and Gary Soucie after Brower's split with the Sierra Club because of the latter's positive approach to nuclear energy. The founding donation of $500,000 (in 2019 USD) was provided by Robert Orville Anderson, the owner of Atlantic Richfield oil company. It became an international network of organizations in 1971 with a meeting of representatives from four countries: U.S., Sweden, the UK and France.

FoEI currently has a secretariat (based in Amsterdam, Netherlands) which provides support for the network and its agreed major campaigns. The executive committee of elected representatives from national groups sets policy and oversees the work of the secretariat. In 2016, Uruguayan activist Karin Nansen was elected to serve as chair of the organization.

Campaign issues 
Friends of the Earth (International) is an international membership organisation, with members spread across the world. Its advocacy programs focus on environmental issues, highlighting their social, political and human rights contexts. The international wing of Friends of the Earth is headquartered in Amsterdam, Netherlands, for tax reasons.

As per its website, the current campaign priorities of Friends of the Earth internationally are: economic justice and resisting neoliberalism; forests and biodiversity; food sovereignty; and climate justice and energy. The campaign priorities of FOEI are set at its bi-annual general meeting. Additionally, FOEI also plans campaigns in other fields, such as desertification; Antarctica; maritime, mining and extractive industries; and nuclear power. In 2016, FOEI also led a campaign on the consumption and intensive production of meat (Meat Atlas).

FOEI claims that it has been successful as it has eliminated billions in taxpayer subsidies to corporate polluters, reformed the World Bank to address environmental and human rights concerns, pushed the debate on global warming to pressure the U.S. to attempt the best legislation possible, stopped more than 150 destructive dams and water projects worldwide, pressed and won landmark regulations of strip mines and oil tankers and banned international whaling. Its critics claim that the organization tries only to obtain media attention (as by releasing the song "Love Song to the Earth"), but does not stay with locals to actually solve complicated problems, and that it prevents development in developing countries. They have also been critical of its policy to accept high levels of funding from companies and charities related to oil and gas.

Structure of the network 
The member organization in a particular country may name itself Friends of the Earth or an equivalent translated phrase in the national language, e.g., Friends of the Earth (US), Friends of the Earth (EWNI) (England Wales and Northern Ireland), Amigos de la Tierra (Spain and Argentina). However, roughly half of the member groups work under their own names, sometimes reflecting an independent origin and subsequent accession to the network, such as Pro Natura (Switzerland), the Korean Federation for Environmental Movement, Environmental Rights Action (FOE Nigeria) and WALHI (FOE Indonesia).

Friends of the Earth International (FoEI) is supported by a secretariat based in Amsterdam, and an executive committee known as ExCom. The ExCom is elected by all member groups at a general meeting held every two years, and it is the ExCom which employs the secretariat. At the same general meeting, overall policies and priority activities are agreed.

In addition to work which is coordinated at the FoEI level, national member groups are free to carry out their own campaigns and to work bi- or multi-laterally as they see fit, as long as this does not go against agreed policy at the international level.

Publications 
The Meat Atlas is an annual report on the methods and impact of industrial animal agriculture. The publication consists of 27 short essays and, with the help of graphs, visualises facts about the production and consumption of meat. The Meat Atlas is jointly published by Friends of the Earth and Heinrich Böll Foundation.

Notable supporters 
 Rock musician George Harrison became associated with Friends of the Earth after attending their anti-nuclear demonstrations in London in 1980. He dedicated his 1989 greatest hits album, Best of Dark Horse, to Friends of the Earth, among other environmental organisations.
 Jay Kay, frontman of the funk/acid jazz group Jamiroquai, is known for donating a part of the profits earned from his album sales to Friends of the Earth and Oxfam, among other things.
 Dominique Voynet, who ran in the 1995 and 2007 French presidential elections in the "les verts" parti, or Green Party, is a member.
 Thom Yorke, lead singer of Radiohead, has publicly supported a number of Friends of the Earth campaigns.
 A chorus of superstar voices on "Love Song to the Earth"—including Paul McCartney, Jon Bon Jovi, Sheryl Crow, Fergie, Sean Paul, and Colbie Caillat—join forces on this inspirational pop anthem. All proceeds from each sale of the single will be donated to Friends of the Earth U.S. and the United Nations Foundation.

Support for The Big Ask 
Among those present at the launch of Friends of the Earth (EWNI)'s climate change campaign The Big Ask were Jude Law, Edith Bowman, Siân Lloyd, Ross Burden, David Cameron, David Miliband, Thom Yorke, Stephen Merchant, Michael Eavis, and Emily Eavis.

Member organizations

Asia 

 Indonesian Forum for Environment, Indonesia
 Korean Federation for Environmental Movement
 Friends of the Earth Middle East
 Legal Rights and Natural Resources Center - Kasama sa Kalikasan
 Centre for Environmental Justice, Sri Lanka
 Sahabat Alam Malaysia

Europe 
 Friends of the Earth Europe, Brussels
 Young Friends of the Earth Europe, Brussels
 Friends of the Earth – France
 Friends of the Earth Scotland
 Pro Natura (Switzerland)
 Amigos de la tierra, Spain
 Bund für Umwelt und Naturschutz Deutschland, Germany
 Friends of the Earth (EWNI), England, Wales and Northern Ireland
 Birmingham Friends of the Earth 
 GLOBAL 2000, Austria
 Friends of the Earth Malta
 Friends of the Earth Finland
 Magyar Természetvédok Szövetsége / Friends of the Earth Hungary 
 Priatelia Zeme Slovensko (Friends of the Earth Slovakia) 
 Friends of the Earth (EWNI), (England, Wales and Northern Ireland)
 Manchester Friends of the Earth
 Green Action, Croatia
 Hnutí DUHA, Czech Republic
 Milieudefensie, Netherlands
 Norwegian Society for the Conservation of Nature, Norway
 Friends of the Earth (Malta)
 NOAH, founded in 1969 in Denmark, national organisation of Foe since 1988, Denmark

North America 
 Friends of the Earth Canada
 Les AmiEs de la Terre de Québec, Canada
 Friends of the Earth (US)

Oceania 
 Friends of the Earth Australia

See also 
 Friends of the Earth, Inc. v. Laidlaw Environmental Services, Inc.
 List of environmental organizations
 Friends of the Earth (HK)

Notes and references

Bibliography 
 Brian Doherty and Timothy Doyle, Environmentalism, Resistance and Solidarity. The Politics of Friends of the Earth International (Basingstoke: Palgrave, 2013). 
 Jan-Henrik Meyer, “'Where do we go from Wyhl?' Transnational Anti-Nuclear Protest targeting European and International Organisations in the 1970s,” Historical Social Research 39: 1 (2014): 212–235.

External links 

 
 Article of Friends of the Earth France "Multinationals : Ecologists See Red"
 Friends of the Earth International YouTube channel

 
Nature conservation organizations based in the United States
Anti-nuclear organizations
Environmental organizations established in 1969